Joseph Chiaubaut (26 August 1880 – 23 December 1969) was a Monegasque sports shooter. He competed in the 50 m rifle event at the 1924 Summer Olympics.

References

External links
 

1880 births
1969 deaths
Monegasque male sport shooters
Olympic shooters of Monaco
Shooters at the 1924 Summer Olympics
Place of birth missing